James Marsh (2 September 1794 – 21 June 1846) was a British chemist who invented the Marsh test for detecting arsenic. Born in Kent, he was working as a labourer in Woolwich in the late 1810s and early 1820s, before joining the Royal Artillery. He was married to Mary, and had four children, two of whom died in infancy. His surviving daughters were Lavinia Bithiah (1821-1896) and Lucretia Victoria (1829-1910).

Scientific work 

While Marsh was most famous for inventing the test that bears his name, he was also a skilled and inventive scientist who held the post of Ordnance Chemist at the Royal Arsenal at Woolwich. He developed the screw time fuze for mortar shells and in 1830 the percussion tube. In 1832 HMS Castor was the first ship to have her guns modified with these innovations. They were not approved for the Army until 1845, when Woolwich began their manufacture—for coastal artillery only. They became obsolete in 1866. Marsh also worked as an assistant to Michael Faraday at the nearby Royal Military Academy from 1829 to 1846.

Marsh invented the earliest form of vibrating electrical interrupter in 1824.  It consisted of a straight wire electrically connected and flexibly suspended at the top while the lower end extending into a shallow mercury filled trough which served as a second electrical contact.  The lower end of the wire was also positioned between the poles of a powerful permanent horseshoe-shaped magnet.  When electric current flowed through the wire, the magnetic field of the wire created a force with the field of the permanent magnet such that the wire would rotate out of the mercury trough and interrupt the electrical circuit.  Without the magnetic force, the wire would then fall back due to the force of gravity into the mercury thereby restoring the connection and restarting the cycle of vibration.

In 1833 Marsh was called as a chemist by the prosecution in a murder trial, wherein a certain John Bodle was accused of poisoning his grandfather with arsenic-laced coffee. Marsh performed the standard test by mixing a suspected sample with hydrogen sulfide and hydrochloric acid. While he was able to detect arsenic as yellow arsenic trisulfide, when it came to showing it to the jury it had deteriorated, allowing the suspect to be acquitted due to reasonable doubt. Annoyed by this, Marsh developed a much better test. He combined a sample containing arsenic with sulfuric acid and arsenic-free zinc, resulting in arsine gas. The gas was ignited, and it decomposed to pure metallic arsenic which, when passed to a cold surface, would appear as a silvery-black deposit. So sensitive was the test that it could detect as little as one-fiftieth of a milligram of arsenic. He first described this test in The Edinburgh Philosophical Journal in 1836.

References

Further reading 
 The Inheritor's Powder:  a cautionary tale of poison, betrayal and greed by Sandra Hempel (London, 2013). BBC Radio 4 Book of the Week
 

 
 
 

1794 births
1846 deaths
British chemists
British inventors